WEAC may refer to:

 West African Examinations Council, an education accreditation organization
 Wisconsin Education Association Council, a Wisconsin Education Teachers Union located in Madison, Wisconsin
 WEAC-CD, a low-power television station (channel 35, virtual 24) licensed to serve Jacksonville, Alabama, United States
 WZZQ, a radio station in Gaffney, South Carolina, licensed as WEAC until 2009